Răzvan Casin Țârlea (born 5 August 1979 in Oradea) is a Romanian footballer who plays for Liga IV side Olimpia Salonta.

Career
Țârlea's youth career started during the late 1990s at CSȘ Bihorul, a team from his hometown of Oradea.

He made his senior debut for Portul Constanța, but then was picked up by Farul Constanța. He had an unsuccessful stay, playing only one game. After that, he switched to Midia Năvodari in the second-highest Romanian league, where he played for 2 seasons and appeared in 39 matches, scoring two goals. Later Țârlea would go on to play for Universitatea Cluj for four seasons, helping to get the team promoted from the third-highest to the second-highest league.

He played 61 games and scored 3 goals and during the winter of 2005–2006, he transferred to city rivals CFR in the Liga 1, the top division of Romania. He failed to win a place in the starting eleven and, after six matches in one-year and a half, he moved to Politehnica Iași for a short period before joining Petrolul Ploiești. On 17 August 2009, Țârlea signed an initial one-year contract with Azerbaijani club Gabala FC.

Career statistics

References

External links
 
 
 Răzvan Țârlea at frf-ajf.ro

1979 births
Living people
Sportspeople from Oradea
Romanian footballers
Liga I players
Liga II players
Association football defenders
FCV Farul Constanța players
CS Portul Constanța players
FC Universitatea Cluj players
CFR Cluj players
FC Politehnica Iași (1945) players
FC Petrolul Ploiești players
Azerbaijan Premier League players
Gabala FC players
Kapaz PFK players
Romanian expatriate footballers
Romanian expatriate sportspeople in Azerbaijan
Expatriate footballers in Azerbaijan